The 2012–13 NextGen Series was the second season of the NextGen Series. The tournament involved the under-19 teams from 24 different countries across Europe. The tournament was won by Aston Villa who overcame Chelsea in the final.

Format changes
From the previous season's competition, one major format change has been announced, with the competition moving from a 16-team to a 24-team affair. The group stage was run in six groups of four, an expansion of the same format as the previous season.

Teams
The 24 teams were sorted into six groups, where they played each other home and away in a Round-robin tournament. The top teams advanced to the finals of the competition.

Fifteen of the 16 founder-members reprise their roles, consisting of some of the highest-reputations teams from across UEFA, mirroring the current or recent Champions League involvement of their first teams. Only Basel of Switzerland declined the invitation to reappear.

 Aston Villa
 Liverpool
 Manchester City
 Tottenham Hotspur
 Barcelona
 Wolfsburg
 Internazionale
 Sporting CP
 Marseille
 Ajax
 PSV Eindhoven
 Fenerbahçe
 Celtic
 Molde
 Rosenborg

They were joined by a further nine teams of high standing for the expanded series.

 Arsenal
 Chelsea
 Athletic Bilbao
 Borussia Dortmund
 Juventus
 Paris Saint-Germain
 CSKA Moscow
 Olympiacos
 Anderlecht

Group stage
The 24 teams were sorted into six groups of four, where they play each other home and away in a double round robin format. The top-two teams from each group progressed to the knock-out stages of the competition alongside the four highest points-scoring third-place finishers.

Group 1

Kickoff times are in CET.

Group 2

Kickoff times are in CET.

Group 3

Kickoff times are in CET.

Group 4

Kickoff times are in CET.

Group 5

Kickoff times are in CET.

Group 6

Kickoff times are in CET.

Ranking of third-placed teams

Knockout stage

The knockout round matches were decided by ordering each team from 1 through 16, with the top ranked team facing the lowest ranked team, and on down.

Bracket

Round of 16

Quarterfinals

Semifinals

Third place match

Final

Top goalscorers

Players and teams in bold are still active in the competition:

Note
1: In January 2013 Alex Pritchard moved on loan from Tottenham Hotspur to Peterborough United.

See also
2012–13 UEFA Champions League

References

2012
NextGen Series